Karimangalam is a town and taluk headquarters in Dharmapuri district in t Tamil Nadu. It is located at 20 km from Dharmapuri and 70 km from Salem.

Demographics
 India census, Karimangalam had a population of 13,511. Males constitute 50% of the population and females 50%. Karimangalam has an average literacy rate of 58%, lower than the national average of 59.5%: male literacy is 67%, and female literacy is 49%. In Karimangalam, 12% of the population is under 6 years of age.

References

Cities and towns in Dharmapuri district